Stephen Soldz (born 19 November 1952) is a psychoanalyst, clinical psychologist, professor, and anti-war activist. Soldz is director of the Social Justice and Human Rights program at the Boston Graduate School of Psychoanalysis.

He has received media attention as a vocal critic regarding allegations of the use of psychological torture by the U.S. government in its conduct of the War in Iraq and the War on Terror.

In August 2007, Soldz publicly challenged the American Psychological Association to ban the involvement by professional psychologists in the interrogation of  'enemy combatant' prisoners held by the CIA and Defense Department. Soldz, in an interview with the San Francisco Chronicle, publicly accused psychologists attached to the U.S. military base at Guantanamo Bay of developing and applying torture techniques on detainees while advising interrogators on the levels of abuse that detainees could withstand.  In November 2007, Soldz coauthored an article on psychological torture at Guantanamo Bay with Julian Assange, published via WikiLeaks.

The American Psychological Association did not pass the ban advocated by Soldz, but instead issued a resolution stating its opposition to torture and restricting its members from participating in interrogations that involved practices that could be defined as torture.<ref>[https://www.washingtonpost.com/wp-dyn/content/article/2007/08/20/AR2007082000653.html?tid=informbox "US Psychologists Scrap Interrogation Ban," The Washington Post,## 20 August, 2007]</ref>

Additionally, Soldz, in his role as the publisher of the Iraq Occupation and Resistance Report web site, has written for Znet website questioning the accuracy in reporting the number of Iraqi civilian deaths since the March 2003 invasion and has challenged claims that the al-Jazeera television network was supportive of Saddam Hussein. He has also written opinion columns on the Iraq war for the Daily Kos web site.

Outside of politics, Soldz and Leigh McCullough co-edited the 1999 book Reconciling Empirical Knowledge and Clinical Experience: The Art and Science of Psychotherapy, published by the American Psychological Association. Also in 1999, Soldz and George E. Vaillant published their article "The Big Five Personality Traits and the Life Course: A 45-Year Longitudinal Study" in the '''Journal of Research in Personality. The journal's editors later named the Soldz-Vaillant article as the publication's most important paper for that year.

See also 
 James Elmer Mitchell

References

External links
Official web site
Stephen Soldz' Daily Kos columns
Stephen Soldz interviewed on KCRW-FM's "To the Point" on 30 May, 2007
 Stephen Soldz blog: Psyche, Science and Society

1952 births
American anti-war activists
American psychoanalysts
American anti–Iraq War activists
Guantanamo Bay detention camp
Living people
21st-century American psychologists
20th-century American psychologists